Kim Andre Lund (born 11 September 1990) is a Norwegian sport shooter.

He participated at the 2018 ISSF World Shooting Championships, winning a medal.

References

External links

Living people
1990 births
Norwegian male sport shooters
ISSF rifle shooters